Corbriggs is a small settlement in Derbyshire, England. The appropriate civil parish is called Grassmoor, Hasland and Winsick.

External links
Corbriggs at Streetmap.co.uk
Official Parish Website: http://www.corbriggs.org.uk/

Hamlets in Derbyshire
North East Derbyshire District